The men's 440 yards hurdles at the 1962 British Empire and Commonwealth Games as part of the athletics programme was held at the Perry Lakes Stadium on Saturday 24 November and Monday 26 November 1962.

The top three runners in each of the two heats qualified for the final.

The event was won by Australian Ken Roche in 51.5 seconds, ahead of Kenya's Kimaru Songok and Benson Ishiepai from Uganda. Roche was trailing Songok at the final hurdle but managed to seal the victory over the final 10 yards by 0.4 seconds.

Records

Heats

Heat 1

Heat 2

Final

References

Men's 440 yards hurdles
1962